The 14th Annual Tony Awards took place at the Astor Hotel Grand Ballroom on April 24, 1960, and was broadcast on local television station WCBS-TV in New York City. The Master of Ceremonies was Eddie Albert.

Ceremony
Presenters: Jean Pierre Aumont, Lauren Bacall, Ray Bolger, Peggy Cass, Jo Van Fleet, Helen Hayes, Celeste Holm, Edward Albert Kenny, Sally Koriyo, Carol Lawrence, Vivien Leigh, Darren McGavin, Helen Menken, Robert Morse, Elliott Nugent, Lauri Peters, Christopher Plummer, Jason Robards. Music was by Meyer Davis and his Orchestra.

The ceremony was attended by 1,200 at the Astor Hotel. Michael Kidd received his fifth Tony Award for choreography, Mary Martin won her third award as actress in a musical, and two musicals tied as best musical — Fiorello! and The Sound of Music.

For the first time, several award categories (director, scenic designer) had separate awards for plays and musicals.

Winners and nominees
Winners are in bold

Special awards
John D. Rockefeller III, for vision and leadership in creating the Lincoln Center, a landmark of theatre encompassing the performing arts.
James Thurber and Burgess Meredith (A Thurber Carnival)

Multiple nominations and awards

These productions had multiple nominations:

10 nominations: Take Me Along
9 nominations: The Sound of Music 
8 nominations: Gypsy 
7 nominations: Fiorello! and Greenwillow  
6 nominations: The Best Man and Toys in the Attic 
5 nominations: The Miracle Worker 
4 nominations: Destry Rides Again and A Raisin in the Sun 
3 nominations: Sweet Bird of Youth and The Tenth Man 
2 nominations: Once Upon a Mattress and Saratoga 

The following productions received multiple awards.

5 wins: The Sound of Music 
4 wins: The Miracle Worker 
3 wins: Fiorello! 
2 wins: Toys in the Attic

References

External links
 Tony Awards Official Site

Tony Awards ceremonies
1960 in theatre
1960 awards
1960 in the United States
1960 in New York City
1960 awards in the United States
April 1960 events in the United States